Cafe on the Corner is the ninth studio album by American country music band Sawyer Brown. Released in 1992 by Curb Records, it produced three singles on the Billboard country music charts: the title track, "All These Years", and "Trouble on the Line". "All These Years", previously recorded by writer Mac McAnally on his 1992 album Live and Learn.

Track listing

Personnel 
Sawyer Brown
 Mark Miller – lead vocals
 Gregg "Hobie" Hubbard – keyboards, backing vocals
 Duncan Cameron – lead guitars, dobro, steel guitar, backing vocals
 Jim Scholten – bass
 Joe "Curley" Smyth – drums, percussion

Additional musicians
 John Barlow Jarvis – keyboards, acoustic piano 
 Mike Lawler – keyboards, synthesizers 
 Mac McAnally – guitars, backing vocals 
 Ron Reynolds – guitars, percussion 
 Randy Scruggs – guitars 
 JayDee Mannes – steel guitar 
 Roger Hawkins – drums, percussion 
 Larrie Londin – drums, percussion 
 Terry McMillan – harmonica, percussion 
 John Catchings – cello (3)
 Kristin Wilkinson – viola (3)
 David Davidson – violin (3)
 Clara Olson – violin (3)
 Edgar Meyer – string arrangements (3)
 Bob Bailey – backing vocals
 Vicki Hampton – backing vocals
 Donna McElroy – backing vocals, lead vocals (9)

Production 
 Mark Miller – producer 
 Randy Scruggs – producer 
 Ron Reynolds – recording, mixing 
 Jim Cotton – overdub engineer 
 Greg Currier – overdub engineer 
 Todd Culross – assistant overdub engineer 
 Glenn Meadows – digital editing, mastering 
 Virginia Team – art direction
 Jerry Joyner – design 
 Peter Nash – photography 
 Lisa Miller – make-up
 Noel German – hair stylist 
 Edited and Mastered at Masterfonics (Nashville, Tennessee).

Chart performance

1992 albums
Curb Records albums
Sawyer Brown albums